The 2013 San Diego State Aztecs football team represented San Diego State University in the 2013 NCAA Division I FBS football season. The Aztecs were led by third-year head coach Rocky Long and played their home games at Qualcomm Stadium. They were members of the West Division of the Mountain West Conference. They finished the season 8–5, 6–2 in Mountain West play to finish in second place in the West Division. They were invited to the Famous Idaho Potato Bowl where they defeated Buffalo.

Schedule

Source:

Game summaries

Eastern Illinois

@ Ohio State

Oregon State

@ New Mexico State

Nevada

@ Air Force

Fresno State

New Mexico

@ San Jose State

@ Hawaii

Boise State

@ UNLV

vs Buffalo–Famous Idaho Potato Bowl

Jeff Hilyer from the Sun Belt Conference was the referee.

References

San Diego State
San Diego State Aztecs football seasons
Famous Idaho Potato Bowl champion seasons
San Diego State Aztecs football